Claudia Morales Medina (born 20 May 1969 in Villavicencio) is a journalist, broadcaster, and presenter on Colombian radio and television. She is recognized as one of the leading voices on Colombia radio.

Life 
Claudia Morales was born in Villavicencio and then moved to Bogotá  to study journalism at the Universidad of the Sabana. She began her journalistic career in the newspaper La Prensa, with Juan Carlos Pastrana. Later she was part of the journalistic writing of TV news programs HOY, CM& with Yamid Amat, Mauricio Vargas and Ricardo Santamaría, and Noticias Uno. Then she traveled to the United States where she worked as international press officer of the presidency of Álvaro Uribe between 2003 and 2004. In 2005, she worked on the W Radio network, with Julio Sánchez Cristo, Felix de Bedout and Alberto Casas Santamaría until 2009.

In 2011, she returned to Colombia to direct with Darío Arizmendi, Diana Calderón, Erika Fontalvo, Camilo Durán Casas,  and Gustavo Gómez Córdoba in Caracol Radio in the programs of Hoy por Hoy and Hora 20. In 2013 and 2017, she directed the Luciérnaga with Hernán Peláez later with Gustavo Gómez Córdoba. In 2016, she was threatened by police officers after revealing secrets on her radio program with journalist Vicky Dávila in The Fellowship of the Ring scandal in which she received criticism for her work.

References

External links 
 
 

Colombian radio presenters
Colombian women journalists
1969 births
People from Villavicencio
Colombian television presenters
Living people
Colombian women radio presenters
Colombian women television presenters
University of La Sabana alumni